Miss World Sri Lanka is a beauty contest held in Sri Lanka to select the country's representative to the Miss World. This is a list of women who have represented the Sri Lanka at the Miss World pageant.

History
Sri Lanka debut in 1953 at Miss World pageant. Previously the country named as Ceylon for competing at the pageant in 1957 to 1972. Nowadays, the official name for the country named as Sri Lanka. Miss Sri Lanka pageant became national franchise for Miss World, Miss Universe, Miss International and Miss Asia Pacific International pageants.

Since 1953 the official winner competed at Miss World, sometimes a handpicked delegate is sent. Sri Lanka has one International winner from Miss Asia Pacific International, Bernadine Rosemarie Fernando Ramanyake in 1985, she was crowned the official winner in Kuala Lumpur, Malaysia.

In 1996 Miss Sri Lanka did not exist but Sri Lanka representatives crowned by another organization.
 
In 2003 the new pageant built as Miss World Sri Lanka pageant and the winner would be representing Sri Lanka at Miss World pageant. The pageant was hosting by TV Derana.

Titleholders 
Color key

Since 2003 the winner of Miss World Sri Lanka represents her country at Miss World. On occasion, when the winner does not qualify (due to age) for either contest, a runner-up is sent.

See also
 Miss Earth Sri Lanka
 Miss Universe Sri Lanka
 Miss Sri Lanka Online

References

External links
 Official website of Miss World

Miss World by country
Beauty pageants in Sri Lanka
Sri Lankan awards
Lists of women